Victor Grossman (born March 11, 1928) is an American publicist and author who defected to the Soviet Union in 1952. He studied journalism in East Germany and remained there working as a journalist and writer. He now lives in Germany.

Early life

Born Stephen Wechsler in New York City, he reluctantly changed his name to Victor Grossman after defection to East Germany in order to shield his family members in the United States. As a youth, his family often summered in Free Acres, New Jersey, a community using economic philosopher Henry George's concept of single taxation. While studying at Harvard University as a member of the class of 1949, Grossman joined the Communist Party USA, whose platform claimed unequivocal opposition to racism, exploitation, and most importantly — Nazi Germany. After receiving his degree in economics, he worked in a factory. However, in 1950, Grossman was drafted into the United States Army and stationed in Germany.

Defection
In 1952, while serving in Austria, Grossman swam across the Danube into the Soviet-occupied zone of Austria, and became one of a handful of soldiers from the NATO nations who defected to the Eastern Bloc. Grossman later stated he defected because he feared prosecution by U.S. authorities for not declaring his membership in left-wing political organizations prior to his entering the army.

Following assessment by Soviet authorities, Grossman was sent to East Germany, where he continued his studies in journalism at Karl Marx University.

While in East Germany, Grossman was a good friend of his fellow US exile, the singer and actor Dean Reed. He earned his living as a journalist and as a translator.

In 1954, Grossman was recruited as an informant by the East German Ministry of State Security (MfS, or "Stasi"), codename TAUCHER ("Diver").

In 1994, the U.S. Army dropped charges of desertion against him. He reclaimed his U.S. passport and traveled to America several times, including a book tour to promote his memoir Crossing the River: A Memoir of the American Left, the Cold War, and Life in East Germany, published in 2003. Grossman is a frequent contributor to the Marxist magazine Monthly Review.

Selected works
 Nilpferd und Storch. Kinderbuchverlag Berlin, Berlin, 1965
 Von Manhattan bis Kalifornien. Aus der Geschichte der USA. Kinderbuchverlag, Berlin 1974
 Per Anhalter durch die USA. Berlin 1976
 Der Weg über die Grenze. Verlag Neues Leben,  Berlin, 1985
 If I Had a Song – Lieder und Sänger der USA. Lied der Zeit, Berlin, 1988, 
 Crossing the River: A Memoir of the American Left, the Cold War, and Life in East Germany. University of Massachusetts Press, Amherst, Boston, 2003, 
 Madrid, du Wunderbare. Ein Amerikaner blättert in der Geschichte des Spanienkrieges. GNN-Verlag, Schkeuditz, 2006, 
 Ein Ami blickt auf die DDR zurück, Spotless, Berlin, 2011, 
 Rebel Girls: 34 amerikanische Frauen im Porträt, Papyrossa, 2012, 
 A Socialist Defector: From Harvard to Karl-Marx-Allee, Monthly Review Press, 2019,

References

1928 births
American defectors
People of the Cold War
Living people
United States Army soldiers
Writers from New York (state)
American expatriates in East Germany
Defectors to East Germany
Harvard University alumni
American male writers
Leipzig University alumni
American emigrants to East Germany
People of the Stasi